1772 Gagarin is a stony background asteroid from the central region of the asteroid belt, approximately 9 kilometers in diameter. It was discovered on 6 February 1968, by Russian astronomer Lyudmila Chernykh at the Crimean Astrophysical Observatory in Nauchnyj, on the Crimean peninsula. The asteroid was named after cosmonaut Yuri Gagarin.

Orbit and classification 
Gagarin orbits the Sun in the central main-belt at a distance of 2.3–2.8 AU once every 4.02 years (1,467 days). Its orbit has an eccentricity of 0.11 and an inclination of 6° with respect to the ecliptic. Gagarin first observation is a precovery that was taken at Turku Observatory in 1940, extending the body's observation arc by 28 years prior to its official discovery observation.

Physical characteristics 
Gagarin has been characterized as a rare L-type asteroid by PanSTARRS photometric survey.

Rotation period 
In February 1984, a rotational lightcurve of Gagarin obtained by American astronomer Richard P. Binzel gave a rotation period of 10.96 hours with a brightness variation of 0.24 magnitude. Photometric observations at the Californian Palomar Transient Factory in December 2011, gave a 10.9430 hours with an amplitude of 0.41. in 2001 and 2016, additional lightcurve were obtained from modeled photometric data, giving a period of 10.94130 and 10.93791 hours.

Diameter and albedo 
According to the survey carried out by NASA's Wide-field Infrared Survey Explorer with its subsequent NEOWISE mission, Gagarin measures between 8.83 and 9.63 kilometers in diameter, and its surface has an albedo between 0.138 and 0.164, The Collaborative Asteroid Lightcurve Link assumes a standard albedo of 0.20 and derives a diameter of 8.00 kilometers with an absolute magnitude of 12.85.

Naming 
This minor planet was named for Russian–Soviet cosmonaut Yuri Gagarin (1934–1968), Hero of the Soviet Union and first human to journey into outer space by circumnavigating Earth in 1961. Gagarin died in a jet fighter crash in 1968, the year the asteroid was discovered. The lunar crater Gagarin is also named in his honor. The official  was published by the Minor Planet Center on 25 September 1971.

See also
Gagarin (crater)

References

External links 
 Asteroid Lightcurve Database (LCDB), query form (info )
 Dictionary of Minor Planet Names, Google books
 Asteroids and comets rotation curves, CdR – Observatoire de Genève, Raoul Behrend
 Discovery Circumstances: Numbered Minor Planets (1)-(5000)  – Minor Planet Center
 
 

001772
Discoveries by Lyudmila Chernykh
Named minor planets
19680206
Monuments and memorials to Yuri Gagarin